Luís Gonçalves das Chagas, Baron of Candiota (c. 1815–1894) was a Brazilian landowner, military leader and noble.

Born in Rio Grande do Sul, Brazil's southernmost state, Chagas was the owner of several estancias in the municipalities of Santa Maria, São Gabriel and Bagé. He fought the Ragamuffin War (1835–1845) on the Republican side.

In 1865, he raised a regiment to fight for Brazil in the Paraguayan War (1864–1870). On March 20, 1875, Chagas was created Baron of Candiota (the name of a creek in one of his properties) by Emperor Pedro II of Brazil.

References

People from São Gabriel
Brazilian military personnel of the Paraguayan War
1894 deaths
Year of birth uncertain

Brazilian nobility